This list includes China PR players and coaches who participated the Summer Olympics.

1988 Seoul

Men's

Women's

1992 Barcelona

Men's

Women's

1996 Atlanta

Men's

Women's

2000 Sydney

Men's

Women's

2004 Athens

Men's

Women's

2008 Beijing

Men's

Women's

2012 London

Men's

Women's

2016 Rio de Janeiro

Men's

Women's

Notes:
QF=Quarter Final
R=Round
S=Stage

See also
China national table tennis team

Table tennis in China
Table